Max Burt (born ) is a Canadian male volleyball player. He is part of the Canada men's national volleyball team. On club level he plays for Nantes Rezé Métropole Volley.

References

External links
 profile at FIVB.org

1988 births
Canadian men's volleyball players
Living people